Exploria Stadium is a soccer-specific stadium in downtown Orlando, Florida. The stadium is located along West Church Street in the Parramore neighborhood west of Downtown Orlando. It is the home of Orlando City SC, which entered Major League Soccer (MLS) as an expansion franchise in 2015, and their National Women's Soccer League (NWSL) affiliate club, the Orlando Pride. The stadium was completed in time for Orlando City's home opener of the 2017 season on March 5 and it became the first ever venue to permanently host MLS, NWSL, and USL teams all in the same location that year. Originally known as Orlando City Stadium, on June 4, 2019, it was announced that Exploria Resorts (a timeshare entity based in nearby Clermont) had acquired naming rights to the stadium.

As well as home matches for Orlando City, Orlando Pride, the stadium has also been used as a host venue for both the United States men's and women's national teams, the finals for both the NWSL Championship and NCAA Women's College Cup, numerous Florida Cup games, the MLS Combine in 2018 and 2019, and the 2019 MLS All-Star Game.

Aside from soccer, the stadium hosted the 2019 and 2021 Cure Bowl, a college football bowl game, as well as the 2022 Special Olympics USA Games opening ceremony.

History
In April 2013, the City of Orlando purchased downtown land for $8.2 million to be used towards the construction of a $110 million MLS soccer stadium. However, in May, the Florida House of Representatives failed to vote on a bill that had passed the Senate that would have provided up to $30 million in state funds towards the stadium project. Orlando City SC President Phil Rawlins responded by expressing his intent to find alternative funding and keep seeking MLS expansion.

The Orlando downtown soccer stadium moved closer to securing funding on August 8, 2013, when Orange County Mayor Teresa Jacobs and Orlando Mayor Buddy Dyer reached an agreement on a deal to provide financial support for a variety of Orlando projects including the new MLS soccer stadium. The last piece in stadium funding was an October 2013 vote on using an existing tourism tax to fund the final quarter of the $80 million stadium project. On October 22, 2013, the Orange County Board of Commissioners voted 5–2 to approve the use of $20 million in tourist development tax funds to build an $84 million multi-purpose soccer stadium in downtown Orlando.

The National Collegiate Athletic Association (NCAA) announced on December 11, 2013, that the 2016 and 2017 NCAA Women's College Soccer Championship would be held at the new stadium.

On August 4, 2014, the team announced that the stadium location would be moved one block west, to avoid having a delay to the opening day, due to Faith Deliverance Temple fighting the city's eminent-domain claim. The new location resulted in the closure of Parramore Avenue between Church Street and Central Boulevard in February 2015, as the stadium was built right on top of where the road currently runs.

The club played their 2015 MLS inaugural season home matches at Citrus Bowl. On January 13, 2016, club president Phil Rawlins announced that construction of the team's stadium was taking four months longer than expected and that the team would remain at the Citrus Bowl (since renamed Camping World Stadium) for the 2016 season.

On March 5, 2017, Orlando City began the 2017 season by hosting New York City FC in the stadium's inaugural match. Cyle Larin scored the first goal in stadium history as Orlando won 1–0 in front of a sellout crowd of 25,550.

On July 10, 2019, Orlando City progressed to their first U.S. Open Cup semi-final, defeating New York City FC on penalties after a 1–1 draw. The game received viral media coverage for what became known as "The Running of The Wall" when NYCFC won the coin toss for the penalty shoot-out and elected to kick the penalties in front of an empty South Stand, the opposite side of the stadium to The Wall where the Orlando City supporters were located. The Orlando supporters took it upon themselves to run en masse down the length of the concourse and fill up the stand directly behind the goal the penalties were being taken. Adam Grinwis saved two penalties during the shootout win. 

On May 12, 2021, Orlando City majority owner Flavio Augusto da Silva announced he was in advanced negotiations with Zygi and Mark Wilf, owners of the Minnesota Vikings of the NFL, for the sale of the club including the stadium and other related soccer assets. The combined value of the deal was estimated at $400-450 million. The sale was completed on July 21, 2021.

Financing
Orlando City SC's owners announced on May 29, 2015, that the stadium would be privately funded by Orlando City SC and not the city. They also announced they would upgrade the stadium's capacity from 19,000 seats, to somewhere between 25,000 and 28,000 seats. The new plan was unveiled on July 31, increasing capacity to 25,500 by adding seats to the south end to maximize seats without major design changes that would set back the project by an additional year. Costs also rose from $110 million to $155 million.

As part of the private funding venture for the new stadium, at least $15 million has come from 30 foreign investors in countries such as Brazil and China via the EB-5 investment program, which grants American visas in exchange for a $500,000 investment in the project.

More foreign investors looking to obtain green cards through the EB-5 program are joining this project, which has already created around 1000 jobs and is expected to create around 1000 more in an area that much needed its economic growth.

Design
The team released artistic renderings of the stadium on December 11, 2012. On September 30, 2013, the architectural firm Woods Bagot released their drawings of the stadium on their website. The team announced that these drawings were released without their knowledge or input, and that they had not selected an architect yet. Woods Bagot proceed to remove the images from their website. The design phase began on January 7, 2014, when Mayor Buddy Dyer and some of the Orlando City SC staff traveled to Kansas City to begin working with the design firm Populous.

The original renderings of the stadium proposed 18,000 seats, including 2,500 club seats. It would also have 300 seats in specialty suites. It was also supposedly going to have bars, retail shops, and restaurants.

Additional renderings and information about the stadium were released on June 10, 2014. It was initially planned to have a seating capacity of 19,500, with the structural ability to expand to 25,000 in the future. This was changed in May 2015 to simply building room for 25,000 in the initial construction, rather than waiting for another construction period. The field is grass, with canopies over fans to protect them from the elements and to increase noise levels. A four times life size lion sculpture was planned to overlook the entrance. Just before a game began, the lion would rotate 180° to "watch" the action. A festival plaza lined with palm trees on the south end of the plaza, just outside the main entrance at Church Street and Terry Avenue was built (the streets are closed to vehicles during events).
A balcony-style bar just below the video scoreboard with a 360° view was planned as well. A seating section on the north end is dedicated to members of supporters' clubs. As proposed — and if building codes allow — it has no seats, but rails and extra room for "safe standing". The 3,811-capacity section, known as "The Wall" began as a small but ardent collection of fans from the two main supporter groups, The Ruckus and Iron Lion Firm. The supporters' section would also have its own "pub-style" area.

Heineken announced a partnership with multiple MLS teams on November 12, 2014, including Orlando City, making Heineken the official beer of the team as well as giving Heineken naming rights to the ground level bar on the south side of the stadium. In addition to the announcement, a new rendering of the south side from inside the stadium was released.

Panasonic was announced as the team's "Official Technology Partner" on December 17, 2014, in exchange for Panasonic providing on-field and fascia LED boards, the main scoreboard on the south end of the field, and dozens of flat panel TV screens throughout the stadium in suites, offices and work areas.  In addition, Panasonic provides security cameras, control room and other key components for the new stadium.

The stadium includes 49 rainbow-colored seats in Section 12 as a memorial that honors the victims of the 2016 Orlando nightclub shooting.

International soccer matches

Men's matches

Women's matches

Other notable soccer matches

CONCACAF Champions League
Due to the ongoing COVID-19 pandemic, CONCACAF selected Exploria Stadium to host the latter stages of the delayed 2020 CONCACAF Champions League in one centralized and neutral location. With the competition paused in March at the quarter-final stage, three of the four ties had already had the first leg contested. Los Angeles FC vs Cruz Azul was the only outstanding first leg and was changed to a single-leg match as a result. All games were played behind closed doors.

Florida Cup

Friendlies

MLS All-Stars

NCAA

NWSL

U.S. Open Cup

Other sports

Football
In May 2019, Cure Bowl officials announced the college football game would be moved to Exploria Stadium from Camping World Stadium. It was the stadium's first non-soccer event. It moved back to Camping World Stadium in 2020 after it was acquired by ESPN Events but returned the following year.

Other events

Concerts

Gallery

References

External links

City of Orlando Venues: MLS Soccer Stadium
Exploria Stadium at Orlando City SC

2017 establishments in Florida
Major League Soccer stadiums
USL Championship stadiums
National Women's Soccer League stadiums
Buildings and structures in Orlando, Florida
Soccer venues in Florida
Sports venues completed in 2017
Sports venues in Orlando, Florida
CONCACAF Gold Cup stadiums
American football venues in Florida